HG Matthews Brickworks was founded in 1923 by Henry George Matthews and has since been run by his family. It is now managed by his Grandson Jim Matthews. The Matthews brick can be seen in many of the houses in South Buckinghamshire. Almost all new build homes in the Chiltern (district) Council area are built of bricks from this small Brickyard. The firm specialises in traditional brickmaking.

In 2010 Matthews started building a Wood Burning Kiln the aim of which has been to reduce the company's reliance on oil as fuel.

HG Matthews is the largest employer in the village of Bellingdon.

References

Manufacturing companies established in 1923
Companies based in Buckinghamshire
Brick manufacturers
1923 establishments in England
Brickworks in the United Kingdom
Building materials companies of the United Kingdom